Muhammad Saalih Al-Munajjid (محمد صالح المنجد) (born June 7, 1960/30 Dhul hijjah,1380) is a Syrian-born Palestinian-Saudi Islamic scholar. He is the founder of the fatwa website IslamQA, a popular website for Salafi/Wahhabi responses on the topic of Islam.

Early life and education 
Al-Munajjid was born to Palestinian refugees in Aleppo, Syria in 1960 and raised in Saudi Arabia. Al-Munajjid studied Islamic law under the scholar 'Abd al-'Aziz ibn Baaz, but has no Ijazah. He has been described as a respected scholar of the Salafi movement.

IslamQA.info

In 1996, Al-Munajjid launched a question and answer Islamic website, IslamQA.info. The website states that "All questions and answers on this site have been prepared, approved, revised, edited, amended or annotated by Shaykh Muhammad Saalih al-Munajjid, the supervisor of this site." IslamQA.info was banned in Saudi Arabia due to the fact that it was issuing independent fatwas. In Saudi Arabia, the kingdom's Council of Senior Scholars has sole responsibility and authority for issuing fatwas. The Council was granted this sole authority to issue fatwas by a royal edict issued in August 2010 (while restrictions had been in place since 2005, they were seldom enforced); this move was described by Christopher Boucek as "the latest example of how the state is working to assert its primacy over the country's religious establishment."

Views

Common Salafi/Wahhabi themes
Al-Munajjid has said that the Mu`tazila, the Ash'ari, and Maturidi schools of Islamic theology are wrong in applying Ilm al-Kalam (reason or rational discourse) to explain the Quran and are contradicting both the Quran and the Sunnah. Attributes that Allah ascribes to Himself require neither explanation or interpretation instead a Muslim should neither deny the divine attributes nor liken Allah to His creation but accept the statements of Allah in the Quran without questioning.

Al-Munajjid has asserted that it is obligatory to destroy statues and idols that may tempt or confuse the people, whether they are buildings, people, animals or inanimate objects. 

Al-Munajjid has stated that Muslim women are required to cover their entire body including the face (only showing eyes) and hands. This ruling is obligatory. It varies depending on if the woman is around Mahram or non-Mahram men. Around Mahrams they are not required to observe niqab, niqab is obligatory. Women are required to stay in their houses unless they are in the company of a mahram and are forbidden to drive cars as "it leads to evil consequences" such as being "alone with a non-mahram man, unveiling, reckless mixing with men, and committing haraam actions because of which these things were forbidden."

Slavery
Al- Munajjid has not denounced slavery, and in a January 2016 fatwa stated that a man was allowed to have intercourse with a slave that he owns whether he is married or not; and that his wife or wives has no right to object. A Muslim wife "has no right to object to her husband owning female slaves or to his having intercourse with them ... The scholars are unanimous in this assessment, and no one is permitted to view this act as forbidden, or to forbid it. Whoever does so, is a sinner, and is acting against the consensus of the scholars. However, he did state that Islam does condemned ill treatment of slaves. "

Al-Munajjid has stated that slavery necessarily came about because of Jihad against the kuffar (non-believers) and the need to determine what to do with those who have been taken prisoner and thus become property; noting that "In principle, slavery is not something that is desirable" as Islam encourages the freeing of slaves for the expiation of sins. Slaves are to be treated in a "kind manner" including the provision of food and clothing.

Homosexuality
Al-Munajjid has said that "The crime of homosexuality is one of the greatest crimes, the worst of sins and the most abhorrent of deeds, and Allah punished those who did it in a way that he did not punish other nations." He has openly called for the death penalty for sodomy (those that practice male homosexual intercourse), with works distributed in his name saying that "those guilty of this crime are to be killed by the sword".

Blaming natural disasters on religion
Following the 2004 Indian Ocean earthquake and tsunami, he stated: "The problem is that the [Christian] holidays are accompanied by forbidden things, by immorality, abomination, adultery, alcohol, drunken dancing, and … and revelry. A belly dancer costs 2500 pounds per minute and a singer costs 50,000 pounds per hour, and they hop from one hotel to another from night to dawn. Then he spends the entire night defying Allah. Haven't they learned the lesson from what Allah wreaked upon the coast of Asia, during the celebration of these forbidden? At the height of immorality, Allah took vengeance on these criminals. Those celebrating spent what they call 'New Year's Eve' in vacation resorts, pubs, and hotels. Allah struck them with an earthquake. He finished off the Richter scale. All nine levels gone. Tens of thousands dead. It was said that they were tourists on New Year's vacation who went to the crowded coral islands for the holiday period, and then they were struck by this earthquake, caused by the Almighty Lord of the worlds. He showed them His wrath and His strength. He showed them His vengeance. Is there anyone learning the lesson? Is it impossible that we will be struck like them? Why do we go their way? Why do we want to be like them, with their holidays, their forbidden things, and their heresy?"

Books
 Koonu ‘ala al-Khayr A‘waanan (Be Helpers in Doing Good)
 Arba‘oona Naseehah li Islaah al-Buyoot (The Muslim Home: 40 Recommendations)
 33 Sababan li’l-Khushoo‘ (33 Ways of Developing Khushoo‘ in Salaah)
 Al-Asaaleeb an-Nabawiyyah fi ‘Ilaaj al-Akhtaa’ (The Prophet's Methods for Correcting People's Mistakes)
 Saba‘oona Mas’alah fi’s-Siyaam (70 Matters related to Fasting)
 ‘Ilaaj al-Humoom (Dealing with Worries and Stress)
 Al-Manhiyaat ash-Shar‘iyyah (Disallowed Matters)
 Muharramaat istahaana biha Katheer min an-Naas (Prohibitions that are Taken Too Lightly)
 Madha taf‘alu fi’l-Haalaat at-Taaliyah (What you should do in the following situations)
 Zaahirat Da‘f al-Eemaan (Weakness of Faith)
 Wasaa’il ath-Thibaat ‘ala Deen-Illah (Means of Steadfastness: Standing Firm in Islam)
 Ureedu an Atooba Walaakin… (I Want to Repent, But…)
 Shakaawa wa Hulool (Problems and Solutions)
 Siraa‘ ma‘a ash-Shahawaat (Striving against Whims and Desires)

References

External sources

 His Official Site almunajjid.com
 
 

1960 births
Living people
Palestinian Sunni Muslim scholars of Islam
Saudi Arabian Salafis
Saudi Arabian imams
Critics of Shia Islam
People from Aleppo
20th-century imams
21st-century imams
Critics of atheism
Critics of Christianity
Saudi Arabian people of Palestinian descent